Roeslerstammia is a genus of moths belonging to the family Roeslerstammiidae, first described by Zeller in 1839.

The species of this genus are found in Asia and Europe.

Species:
 Roeslerstammia erxlebella (Fabricius, 1787)
 Roeslerstammia pronubella (Denis & Schiffermuller, 1775)

References

Roeslerstammiidae
Taxa named by Philipp Christoph Zeller